Touching You, Touching Me is the fifth studio album by American singer-songwriter Neil Diamond. It was the first one since 1966 to feature renditions of other people's material as well as his own. It included a major hit that had already charted, "Holly Holy" (#6), and a minor one, "Until It's Time for You to Go" (#53). The album itself reached #30 on the Billboard album chart and was certified gold. Lee Holdridge was the arranger and conductor.

Despite its title coming from lyrics for the hit song "Sweet Caroline", that track was not included on the US version as it was already on the previous Brother Love's Travelling Salvation Show album. On the UK edition, "Sweet Caroline" was included as the last track on Side A.

Track listing

References

1969 albums
Neil Diamond albums
Uni Records albums
Albums produced by Tommy Cogbill
Albums arranged by Lee Holdridge
Albums conducted by Lee Holdridge
Albums produced by Tom Catalano